The Taça Minas Gerais is a traditional football tournament played in the Minas Gerais state in Brazil. From 1973 through 1977 it was played as a separate tournament, but from 1979 through 1986, it was played as one of the phases in the Campeonato Mineiro, like the Taça Guanabara in the Campeonato Carioca. The tournament was not played again until 1999, but only teams from the interior of Minas Gerais participated and the winner earned itself a berth in the Copa do Brasil. Since 2004, any team from the Campeonato Mineiro's three divisions have been eligible. The winner also gets a berth in the Copa do Brasil as Minas Gerais are allowed five, the other four go to the top four finishers of the Campeonato Mineiro.

List of champions

(1) Since 2011 Ituiutaba is named Boa Esporte.

Club titles
 5 titles
 Cruzeiro: 1973, 1982, 1983, 1984, 1985
 Atlético: 1975, 1976, 1979, 1986, 1987
 3 titles
 Uberaba: 1980, 2009, 2010
 2 titles
 Boa Esporte: 2007, 2012
 Ipatinga: 2004, 2011
 URT: 1999, 2000
 Villa Nova: 1977, 2006
 1 title
 Democrata de Governador Valadares: 1981
 América: 2005
 Tupi: 2008
 Uberlândia: 2003

References 
Guillermo Alexander Rivera, Lisandro Pavan: Minas Gerais Cup - List of Champions / Taça Minas Gerais - Lista de Campeões, RSSSF Brasil, 18 June 2012.

Minas Gerais, Taca
Football competitions in Minas Gerais